Krieewelsche pappköpp  is a theatre in Krefeld, North Rhine-Westphalia, Germany.

Theatres in North Rhine-Westphalia